Catesby is an English surname. Notable people with the surname include:

 John Catesby (died 1486), British judge
 John Catesby (MP for Warwickshire) (died 1405), MP for Warwickshire (UK Parliament constituency)
 John Catesby (MP for Northamptonshire), MP for Northamptonshire (UK Parliament constituency) in 1425 and 1429
 Mark Catesby (1683–1749), English naturalist
 Robert Catesby (1573–1605), English leader of the Gunpowder Plot
 William Catesby (1450–1485), one of King Richard III of England's principal councillors, Chancellor of the Exchequer and Speaker of the House of Commons
 William Catesby (died 1478), English landowner and MP for Northamptonshire in 1449 and 1453
 William Catesby, High Sheriff of Warwickshire in 1371

English-language surnames